Lionel Edward Sackville-West, 3rd Baron Sackville (15 May 1867 – 28 January 1928), was a British peer.

Sackville-West was the son of the Honourable William Edward Sackville-West, sixth son of George Sackville-West, 5th Earl De La Warr and Lady Elizabeth Sackville. His mother was Georgina, daughter of Capt. George Dodwell, of Kevinsfort House, of Sligo. He inherited the barony in 1908 on the death of his uncle, the diplomat Lionel Sackville-West, 2nd Baron Sackville. In April 1912, Lord Sackville was appointed a deputy lieutenant of Kent. He married his first cousin Victoria Sackville-West (1862–1936), illegitimate daughter of the second Baron, in 1890. Their daughter was the novelist and poet Vita Sackville-West.

References

External links 
 ThePeerage.com – Lionel Edward Sackville-West, 3rd Baron Sackville
 http://www.william1.co.uk/w15.html The Descendants of William the Conqueror
 National Register of Archives – West, Lionel Edward Sackville- (1867–1928) 3rd Baron Sackville

Barons in the Peerage of the United Kingdom
1867 births
1928 deaths
Lionel Sackville-West, 03 Baron Sackville
Deputy Lieutenants of Kent
Lionel